This is a list of people who have served as Vice-Admiral of the Coast of Norfolk. Prior to 1594 the office holder was also Vice-Admiral of Suffolk.

Sir William Gonson 1536–1544
Sir William Woodhouse 1554–1564 (MP for Great Yarmouth) jointly with
Sir Thomas Woodhouse 1554–1572 (MP for Great Yarmouth) and
Henry Woodhouse 1563–1579
William Heydon 1579–? jointly with
Christopher Heydon 1579–?
Sir Robert Southwell 1585–1597
Thomas Talbot 1597–1600
Sir Robert Mansell 1600–1618
Sir Thomas Southwell 1618–1635
Henry Howard, Lord Maltravers 1635–1642?
vacant
Edwin Rich 1644–1649 (Parliamentary)
vacant
Horatio Townshend, 1st Baron Townshend 1663–1676
Robert Paston, 1st Earl of Yarmouth 1676–1683
vacant
Sir Henry Hobart, 4th Baronet 1691–1698
Charles Paston, Lord Paston 1699–1718
William Paston, 2nd Earl of Yarmouth 1719
John Hobart, 1st Earl of Buckinghamshire 1719–1756
George Walpole, 3rd Earl of Orford 1757–1791
George Townshend, 1st Marquess Townshend 1792–1807
vacant
William Harbord, 2nd Baron Suffield 1809–1821
John Wodehouse, 2nd Baron Wodehouse 1822–1846

References
Institute of Historical Research

Vice Admiral
Norfolk
Vice Admiral